Pedro José Rada y Gamio (15 August 1873 – 25 May 1938) was a Peruvian politician in the early 20th century. He served as the President of the Chamber of Deputies from 1921 to 1922. 
He was the mayor of Lima from 1922 to 1925 and the prime minister of Peru from 7 December 1926 to 12 October 1929.

References

Mayors of Lima
Presidents of the Chamber of Deputies of Peru
Prime Ministers of Peru
1873 births
1938 deaths